Robert Fraser FRSL (born 10 May 1947) is a British author and biographer.

Early life

Fraser was born on 10 May 1947 in Surbiton, Surrey, the second son of Harry MacKenzie Fraser, a London solicitor, and Ada Alice Gittins of Pontypool in the county of Monmouthshire. His brother was Malcolm Fraser (1939–2012), Emeritus Professor of Opera at the University of Cincinnati and co-founder of the Buxton Festival. At the age of eight, Robert Fraser won a choral scholarship to Winchester Cathedral, where he sang the daily services while studying at the Pilgrims School in the Close. Among his fellow choristers were the future newscaster Jon Snow and international tenor Julian Pike. After attending Kingston Grammar School. Fraser went on to the University of Sussex to read English with David Daiches and Anthony Nuttall. He later wrote a doctorate on tradition in English poetry at Royal Holloway, University of London, where the college's famous gallery of Victorian paintings was to inspire his illustrated volume of poetry The Founders’ Gift: Impressions from a Collection (2017). Simultaneously with his doctorate he studied Harmony, Counterpoint and Composition at Morley College with Melanie Daiken and James Iliff.

Teaching
Fraser began his teaching career at the University of Cape Coast in Ghana, where he lectured from 1970 to 1974 before moving to the University of Leeds to teach under Geoffrey Hill. He subsequently held posts in the University of London and at Trinity College, Cambridge, where he was Director of Studies in English until 1993, tutoring among others the novelist Belinda Starling and the actor Alexander Armstrong.

Fraser is currently Emeritus Professor of English at the Open University and a Fellow of the Royal Society of Literature.

Writing
Fraser's choral background can be detected in his work for the stage, such as the performing translation of Domenico Cimarosa's opera Il pittor parigino performed at Buxton in 1989. He has also published articles on the cultural and political contexts of the music of Purcell and Handel His comparative essays on literature and music are collected in Literature, Music and Cosmopolitanism: Culture as Migration (2018). He is the author of several biographical works for the theatre, including plays on the lives of the composer Carlo Gesualdo and of Byron. God's Good Englishman, his dramatic portrait of Samuel Johnson, opened at the Oxford Playhouse in 1984 and toured Britain with the actor Timothy West in its title role.

Marcel Proust and Sir James Frazer
Academically, Fraser is both a Proust scholar and a specialist in the writing of his near namesake, the classicist and cultural anthropologist James George Frazer, on whom he has published several books, and the genesis of whose best known work on magic, religion and myth he charted in The Making of The Golden Bough: The Origins and Growth of An Argument. A study in intellectual gestation, it was later integrated into the full "archive" edition of Frazer's magnum opus as a special introductory volume. In 1994 he edited for the Oxford World's Classics a "new abridgement" of Frazer's classic that brought some of its most provocative ideas back into general circulation, including theories on Christianity and sacred prostitution.

At the same time, he is a respected critic of the work of Marcel Proust, on whom he has published a much-cited study, and spoken on BBC Radio 4's In Our Time.

Biography and poetry 
In the wider literary world, Fraser is principally associated with the life and work of certain twentieth-century British poets. In the early 1980s he conducted a dispute with Laura Riding, former consort of Robert Graves, who took issue with his review of her Collected Poems.

In 1987, he edited the Collected Poems, and in 1995 the Selected Poems, of T. S. Eliot's protégé George Barker. His life of Barker, The Chameleon Poet, aroused opposition among some members of the poet's own family. But on its appearance in late 2001 it was warmly reviewed by the poets laureate Carol Ann Duffy and Andrew Motion, and by the writers Anthony Thwaite, Vernon Scannell, Humphrey Carpenter and Frederic Raphael; it was chosen by the novelist D. J. Taylor as Spectator Book of the Year for 2002.

In 2012, Fraser's biography of the poet David Gascoyne, Barker's lifelong friend, was published by the Oxford University Press. The book was criticised in some quarters for devoting insufficient space to the darker side of Gascoyne's personality. "Fatally," remarked Paul Batchelor in The Times Literary Supplement "Fraser has little time for introverts". In marked contrast, reviewing the book for The Guardian, Iain Sinclair lauded it as "a witnessed romance of manners and slights, a landscape in which cold biographical facts are converted into metaphors of questing vision, delirium, breakdown". In May the book was placed first in the Independent's chart of 10 best new biographies. Fraser's own poetry is collected in Fox Hill in The Snow and other poems (2016).

Literature in the World

Fraser was one of the guiding spirits behind Heinemann Educational Book's celebrated African Writers Series, and is a founding editor of the 35-year-old journal Wasafiri. He has published a "critical history" of West African poetry, along with monographs on Ben Okri– a personal friend – and the Ghanaian novelist Ayi Kwei Armah. During 2004–7 he travelled in India and Africa researching a comparative account of publishing in those regions which appeared in 2008 as Book History Through Postcolonial Eyes: Re-Writing the Script. The Cambridge Companion to the History of the Book described this as "a highly nuanced, densely argued comparative study of the technologies of the intellect – speech, gesture and print – as they manifest themselves in South Asia and sub-Saharan Africa", and concluded: "In an exposé of the necessary rapprochement between book history and postcolonialism Fraser counters the evolutionary telos of western print capitalism, challenges alphabetical literacy as the universal litmus test registering the impact of writing systems and print technologies, and disputes an indifferentiated approach to the history of the non-western book. He argues that communicative forms are multivalent, mutually constitutive, opportunistic and deeply implicated in their resistance to, or adaptation of, local cultural expressions." Over the same period, Fraser co-edited with his friend Professor Mary Hammond of Southampton University a two-volume survey of international publishing entitled Books Without Borders. In October 2005, in connection with this work, he was elected a Fellow of the Royal Asiatic Society

Style 
Fraser has been described as a writer "who tries to keep one foot planted in, and the other well outside, academe". Yale's Harold Bloom has noted his powers of comparative analysis, and Harvard's Biodun Jeyifo has commended the "superb work" of "this meticulous scholar-critic". The classicist Roger Just has also drawn attention to his "care, precision, good sense and…admirable lightness of touch.". However, his writing has also given rise to vocal dissent, adopting as he does a line that seems now radical, now trenchantly traditionalist. His decision, in the words of John McLeod, "not to work with the niceties and orthodoxies of postcolonial theory" has on occasions given rise to sharply worded rejoinders. He has little time for critical fashion and in 1999 coined the mocking term "Theocolonialism" to describe the subordination of independent judgement to passing fad, and the purported tendency among some academics in the field of literary studies to leap aboard noisy bandwagons.

Personal life

For 32 years, until her death in 2014, Fraser was married to the law lecturer Catherine Birkett. In 2018, he published Pascal’s Tears: How Not to Murder One’s Wife, a 270-page "opened letter" narrating the circumstances of her death, and meditating on the ethical, legal and religious implications of her treatment. Their son is the theoretical physicist Dr Benedict Joseph ("Benjo") Fraser. Robert Fraser is now married to the biographer and food historian Dr Brigid Allen.

References

External links
Open University Faculty of Arts – Robert Fraser recent work

English biographers
1947 births
Living people
People from Surbiton
Alumni of the University of Sussex
Alumni of Royal Holloway, University of London
Academics of the University of Leeds
Academics of the University of Cambridge
Fellows of the Royal Society of Literature